Sinnayah Sabapathy (30 November 1947 – 14 December 2022) was a Malaysian sprinter and coach. He competed in the men's 4 × 400 metres relay at the 1972 Summer Olympics.

Sabapathy won the silver medal in the men's 200m at the 1973 Southeast Asian Peninsular Games.

Sabapathy suffered from Alzheimer's disease in later years. He died in Seremban on 14 December 2022, at the age of 75.

References

External links 

 Man of the Hour (2019)

1947 births
2022 deaths
Athletes (track and field) at the 1972 Summer Olympics
Southeast Asian Games medalists in athletics
Malaysian male sprinters
Olympic athletes of Malaysia
People from Negeri Sembilan
Southeast Asian Games silver medalists for Malaysia